Berlin Brandenburg International School (BBIS) is an IB World School. English is the language of instruction at BBIS, meaning that all subjects, including maths, drama, humanities, technology, music, design, art, etc. are taught in English. The school is divided into elementary, middle and upper schools.
Berlin Brandenburg International School is led by Nick Hazell (director), Burkhard Dolata (CFO), and a team of three principals. BBIS is home to 700 students, 99 Teachers, and 20 Assistants.

Programmes

The Berlin Brandenburg International School (BBIS) can be considered unique in that it was the first IB school in the world to be fully authorized by the International Baccalaureate organization in Geneva, Switzerland to teach all four IB programmes covering the 3 to 19-year-old age range. In addition, BBIS provides boarding facilities for students from grades 9-12. Foreign languages taught are: German, French, Spanish, Mandarin (from grade 8
).

Facilities

Facilities at BBIS include four large red brick buildings, an Arts pavilion, a sports hall, and a sports field. The buildings provide large classrooms for the Elementary, Middle, and High School, including modern Science labs, two computer labs, several computer carts, a purpose-built design/technology area, art studios, music classrooms and practice rooms, a multi-purpose room, a performance and exhibition space, a study room for grades 11 and 12 students, and faculty lounges. Between the buildings are a playground for the Elementary School students and a shared quad for Elementary and Middle School students. The school also plans to incorporate a swimming pool for GISST competitions.

Opposite the school buildings is a full-sized artificial-turf sports field with a six-lane running track. The field also includes a complete football apparatus, sand court for beach volleyball, one basketball court, and facilities for the high and long jump, discus throwing, and shot put. The Sport Hall facility can be divided into 3 separate courts. There is also audience seating and a fitness room. The gyms, which can be combined into one large space, are fully equipped for basketball, volleyball, handball, indoor soccer, and tennis. Additionally, the hall contains a climbing wall, rings, climbing ropes, wall bars, and other professional-quality sports equipment. The sports hall is also used by the school as an auditorium, concert hall and for graduation events.

The basketball court serves as home court for the TKS 49ers.

The School

The school day is from 8.00 am to 3.00 pm. The diplomas offered are IB Diploma, IB Career-related Certificate, BBIS High School Diploma, and MYP Certificate/Mittlerer Schulabschluss (MSA). BBIS also offers a school bus service for students with a total of 9 busses to Berlin/Potsdam, as well as 2 late bus services. The Student Support Services include a School Psychologist, English as an Additional Language (EAL), School Counselling, Careers and College Guidance Counselling Learning, Support, Health Service, and a Gifted and Talented Programme. As of October 2015, BBIS offers the following extracurricular activities:
Sailing Club, Anti-Racism Alliance, Belly Dancing, Ceramics and Pottery, Climbing,
Basketball, Craft Club, Karate, Football, Board Games, Watercolour
Painting, Reading Club, Archery, Badminton, Volleyball, Cross
Country, Swimming, Rowing, Chess Club, International
Award, Model United Nations, Gay Straight Alliance, Drama Club,
Orchestra, Chamber Music Ensemble, Maths Club, Chinese
Calligraphy, Stage Design, Newspaper Club, Human Rights Club,
Programme for Academic Success (PAS), PAS Science, Habitat for
Humanity, Student Ambassadors Programme, Upper School Student Council,
Lunchtime Homework and Study Hall, Life Coaching Through Music,
Creative Writing, Music in Film, Spanish Club, The Get Organised
Group, Culture Club (Selection), Rugby, Karate.

References

External links

Berlin Brandenburg International School official website
Berlin Brandenburg International School facts
BBIS in MAZ
BBIS in Morgenpost

Boarding schools in Germany

International schools in Berlin

International Baccalaureate schools in Germany
Potsdam-Mittelmark
Educational institutions established in 1990
1990 establishments in Germany